Les griffes du passé is a 2014 film directed by Abdelkrim Derkaoui. The film is inspired by two real events. The first is that of Amina Filali who committed suicide after being forced to marry her rapist. The second is that of a woman who was raped and then sentenced to seven years in prison after mutilating her rapist's genitals.

Synopsis 
The melodrama tells the story of Bouchra, a devoted nurse who saves the life of officer Karim, who is working with his brigade to dismantle a terrorist cell. He falls madly in love with her and ends up marrying her.  At the same time, Commissioner Trabelsi, Karim's colleague, is investigating a series of bizarre, violent murders which turns out to be the consequence of a relentless revenge following justice not served.

Cast 

 Narjis Hallak
 Ayoub Layousifi
 Bouchra Khalid
 Ahmed Saguia
 Mouhcine Malzi
 Karim Doniazale
 Abdelghani Sennak
 Noureddine Bikr
 Abdellatif Chagra
 Amine Benjelloun
 Majid Lakroun
 Anis Elkouhen
 Toufik Benjelloun
 Rabea Rafii

References

External links 
 

2014 films
Moroccan drama films